Cindy Klassen,  (born August 12, 1979) is a Canadian retired long track speed skater. She is a six-time medallist having achieved one gold, two silver, three bronze at the Winter Olympics.

She is the only Canadian Olympian to win five medals in a single Olympic games and the first female speed skater to win five medals in a single games at the 2006 Winter Olympics in Turin, Italy. She was a world record holder in the 3000 m until March 2019, when her time was beaten by Martina Sáblíková. She also holds the Canadian records over 1500 m and 5000 m. Klassen is the leader of the Adelskalender, which is the all-time world ranking for speed skating. In 2003, Klassen became the first Canadian in 27 years to win the overall title at the World Speed Skating Championships.

Klassen has several major awards and accolades to her name having won the Lou Marsh Trophy in 2006, which is awarded for Canada's best athlete of the year. Due to her tremendous accomplishments at the 2006 Winter Olympics and her many accomplishments throughout her career, Klassen was named to the Order of Manitoba. Klassen was awarded the Oscar Mathisen Award in 2006 for outstanding speed skating performance of the year. In 2007, she was given the award for Female Athlete of the Year at the Canadian Sports Awards. Klassen won the 2005 and 2006 Bobbie Rosenfeld Award as female athlete of the year as presented from the Canadian Press. She was also tipped as Speed Skating Canada's 2003, 2005, 2006 and 2007 Female Skater of the Year for long track speed skating. The Canadian Mint featured Klassen on a Canadian quarter in 2010 as part of their Olympic memories editions and as a recognition of her six Olympic medals.

Career

Klassen started her sports career as an ice hockey player at Gateway Community Club in Winnipeg; in her youth she played for the Canadian national youth team. When she was not selected for the 1998 Winter Olympics, she switched to speed skating and soon she proved to be a natural talent.

Klassen missed the entire 2003–04 season due to a serious injury: she fell during training, colliding with another skater, hitting his skate, and as a result cutting twelve tendons in her right arm.

Record success
In 2006, she announced she would not carry the Canadian flag at the Opening Ceremony of the Winter Olympics in Turin, Italy, although she had not yet been asked. The flag was instead carried by women's ice hockey veteran Danielle Goyette.

Going into the 2006 Winter Olympics, Klassen was considered one of the favourites following her allround title in 2003 and two world distance titles in 2005. Klassen started out in Turin by winning a silver in the 1000 m, narrowly missing out on gold. Following this silver Klassen became Olympic champion in the 1500 m. She followed this thrilling gold with a silver in the women's team pursuit, and bronze in the 3000 m and 5000 m. Following her fifth and final medal of the Games on February 26, 2006, Klassen said of her success that "Going into the Games, I thought maybe the 1500 and 3000 would be my strong point and maybe I could get a medal in those. To come out with five, it's been better than expected and really a dream come true."

Klassen became the first Canadian to win five medals in one Olympic Games. With this achievement, she tied American Eric Heiden's record of five medals won at an Olympics (1980) by a speed skater. At the same time, she overtook the previous Canadian record of most medals (three) in 1984, held by Gaétan Boucher. Klassen also became the first female speed skater to win five medals in a single Olympics, surpassing Lidiya Skoblikova's four medals in the 1964 Olympics. Combined with her bronze medal at the 2002 Winter Olympics, she became the first Canadian to win six career Olympic medals, surpassing the five medal mark set previously by Marc Gagnon and Phil Edwards and matched in the same race by winner Clara Hughes at the same 2006 Winter Olympic games.

After her success at the Turin Olympics, she was named flagbearer for the closing ceremony. Her winning the largest number of medals at the Turin Olympics caused IOC president Jacques Rogge to call her the "woman of the games". The following day, February 27, Klassen signed the most lucrative endorsement deal ever for a Canadian amateur athlete, with Manitoba Telecom Services (MTS), estimated at about $1 million. Klassen also signed an endorsement deal with McDonald's. On December 11, she was named as the winner of the Lou Marsh Trophy as Canadian athlete of the year, beating out the likes of Joe Thornton, Justin Morneau, Steve Nash and teammate Clara Hughes.

Surgery and the 2010 Olympics

In preparation for the 2010 Winter Olympics in Vancouver, Klassen decided not to participate in the fall races for the Speed Skating World Cup. She returned to competition in 2008 but decided to cut the skating season short in February 2008 after her sister was in a near-fatal accident. She also said that she will only focus on the World Single Distance Championships. Defending her all-around title and high World Cup classifications are not her main goal for the season. Later that year in July 2008 Klassen had surgery to repair damage done to her knees over her career and in high school basketball. The surgeries would keep her from competing in the 2008–09 World Cup. Sometime later in 2009, her doctor discussed her knees saying that "These things don't go away, they're not cured. It's not like a broken bone that once it's healed it's back to good strength and can take stress. It's not like that. It's never going to be perfectly normal. It's not possible to get that." He later added that the only way her knees would stop degenerating would be for Klassen to stop speed skating.

On January 5, 2010, the Royal Canadian Mint announced that they were minting 22 million Canadian quarters with an image of Klassen in a speed skating pose on it. 3 million of the quarters were minted with a red maple leaf on it. The mint issued the quarters as an honour to Klassen's six medals in the Olympics, and as part of their Olympic Moments quarter-coins series.

Coming back from double knee-surgery and two years off of skating, Klassen's main goal at the 2010 Winter Olympics in Vancouver was simply to compete. Klassen saying that "My goal is just to qualify. To get there would be great." She failed to medal in 2010, placing 21st in the 1500 m, 14th in the 3000 m, and 12th in the 5000 m. Klassen was also named as an alternate in the team pursuit. While Klassen stated that she was unsure of whether she would continue speed skating after the games, she believed that her knees would hold out and that the 2014 Sochi Olympics were a possibility.

Return from injury and retirement
Klassen qualified for the 2010–11 World Cup in October 2010. Of qualifying, her ongoing injury struggles, and surgery recover Klassen said that "I'm just going to go out and do the best that I can and see what happens. My knees still hurt. Some days are better than others. There's always aches and pains in skating . . . for me I feel like I'm more of a work skater than technical skater. I've been able to do harder training this year than I have in the past, which is a good thing because that's kind of my strong point so I'll see where that takes me. It's been fun but it's been really hard, too." At the first meet of the World Cup season Klassen got her first individual podium result since the 2007–08 season. Klassen finished second in the 3000 m and followed that placing up with a fourth-place finish in the 1500 m the next day.

Despite the pain and fatigue from injuries, a further competitive gear was found for Klassen as part of the women's team pursuit. She became a part of the team that first won gold at the 2011 World Championships and then came back at the 2012 Worlds to win a silver as repeat medallists. That same season she had also helped to pull the women to the top of the World Cup title, winning three of four races that year together with Brittany Schussler and Christine Nesbitt.

She retired in June 2015 after the tail end of her career was hampered by injuries. Klassen issued a retirement interview stating "It's been an incredible honour to represent Canada in speed skating for 15 years. Speed skating has been a blessing in my life. It has provided me with unbelievable experiences and has taught me many life lessons."

Post retirement from sports
After retirement from sports, she finished a degree in psychology and joined the Calgary Police Service as a constable.

Results

Records
On March 18, 2006, Cindy Klassen Set the women's 3000m world record in Calgary, Canada, which stood almost 13 years until March 2, 2019. Martina Sáblíková beat Klassen's time of 3:53.34 by 0.03 seconds at the Allround World Championships in Calgary. Cindy Klassen is the leader of the Adelskalender, the all-time world ranking.

World records 

Source: SpeedSkatingStats.com.

See also
List of multiple Olympic medalists at a single Games
List of multiple Winter Olympic medalists
German Canadian

References

External links
Cindy Klassen's official homepage
"Canada’s greatest Olympian Cindy Klassen and MTS form winning team with major sponsorship deal" – MTS press release, February 27, 2006
 Cindy Klassen's results – at SpeedSkatingStats.com
Cindy Klassen biography – at Speed Skating Canada
Photos of Cindy Klassen – at Lars Hagen's DESG Photo website

1979 births
Living people
Canadian female speed skaters
Canadian women's ice hockey players
Olympic speed skaters of Canada
Olympic medalists in speed skating
Olympic gold medalists for Canada
Olympic silver medalists for Canada
Olympic bronze medalists for Canada
Speed skaters at the 2002 Winter Olympics
Speed skaters at the 2006 Winter Olympics
Speed skaters at the 2010 Winter Olympics
Medalists at the 2002 Winter Olympics
Medalists at the 2006 Winter Olympics
World Allround Speed Skating Championships medalists
World Single Distances Speed Skating Championships medalists
World Sprint Speed Skating Championships medalists
Speed skaters from Winnipeg
Members of the Order of Manitoba
Lou Marsh Trophy winners
Canadian women police officers
Canadian Mennonites